Jan Gissberg (born 13 August 1948) is a Swedish cartoonist, animator and film director. After studying at Konstfack in Stockholm he started working as an animator under Stig Lasseby, and later went on to direct by himself. As a cartoonist he is best known for drawing Rudolf Petersson's 91:an Karlsson,  and for his high production speed.

Gissberg started drawing already as a child. After high school, he trained in the advertising/illustration line at Konstfack but interrupted his studies to devote himself to animation and cartooning. He also contributed to the Lilla Fridolf series and was one of the artists behind Aron Rapp from the 1970s, together with Magnus Knutsson.

In 1992, Jan Gissberg won a Guldbagge Award in Sweden for his artistic career.

Movies 
 1981 – Peter-No-Tail (film)
 1985 – Peter-No-Tail in Americat
 1987 – Kalle Stropp och Grodan Boll räddar Hönan
 1991 – Charlie Strapp and Froggy Ball Flying High

References

External links
 
 

Swedish comics artists
Swedish film directors
Swedish animators
Swedish animated film directors
1948 births
Living people